Wayward Kenting is a 20-part Taiwanese television series produced by Honto Production and directed by Doze Niu. Most scenes were shot in Hengchun, Taiwan. Wayward Kenting received the Golden Bell Awards for Best Writing for a Television Series and nominations in three other categories.

Synopsis
Zhong Hanwen (Eddie Peng), Liangliang (Lee Kang-i) and Azuo (Lee Shiau Shiang) are good friends who all grew up in Kenting. Wayward Kenting tells the story of their attempts to protect the environment of their home. The series focuses on love, dreams and responsibility.

Cast 
 Eddie Peng as Zhong Hanwen, a twenty-two-year-old man who grows up in Kenting. He is outgoing and kind-hearted. When he reads the article written by DingXiaohui (a famous writer), he falls in love. They begin talking to each other on the Internet. Their story begins when DingXiaohui travels to Kenting.
  as Liangliang, a twenty-two-year-old girl who works in the National Park of Kenting. She is an enthusiastic person, always ready to help people in need. ZhongHanwen and Azuo are both her best friends.
 Sean as Azuo, a twenty-two-year-old policeman. He is wild and brave. Everybody in his neighbourhood knows him. He becomes a shy man around Liangliang. He has been in love with her for many years, but is afraid to show his affection. Afterwards, with the help of ZhongHanwen, he pursues Liangliang desperately.
 Ethan Juan as Guo Shaonan, a twenty-seven-year-old man who works as an illustrator. He and his mother were dropped by his father when he was small. He has once been abroad for nearly two years. At twenty-five, he returns to Kenting despite his mother's strong opposition. Disappointed with his father's cruel treatment, he sets his mind to make great achievements. When in Kenting, he meets Liangliang and develops a romantic relationship.
 Doze Niu as Chu Yiyang, a forty-five-year-old man who runs a variety of bars. His wife divorces him because of his failure in investments. After that, he comes to Kenting. He is so generous and warm-hearted that he wins the respect of local residents.
 Christopher Downs an international environment assessor, who goes to Kenting with DingXiaohui.
 Lin Mei-hsiu as Liangliang's mother
 Weber Yang as ice-cream vendor (cameo)

Episodes 
Lost in paradise--Joanna Wang (王若琳)

As love begins to mend--Joanna Wang (王若琳)

Unparalleled beauty--Sodagreen (苏打绿)

Release 
Wayward Kenting was put on screen on December 17, 2007.

Awards and nominations

Merchandise 
 Book: It Is Sunny In Kenting — released in the year 2007
 DVD: It Is Sunny In Kenting — released in the year 2008

References

External links 
 
Official Website
Blog

Public Television Service original programming
2007 Taiwanese television series debuts
2008 Taiwanese television series endings
Taiwanese television series
Television shows written by Wen Yu-fang